Slampe Station is a railway station on the Tukums II – Jelgava Railway.

References 

Railway stations in Latvia
Railway stations opened in 1904
Tukums Municipality
Semigallia